The Nurses Registration Act 1919  (9 & 10 Geo. 5 c. 94) was an Act of Parliament of the United Kingdom.

It set up the General Nursing Council, and was the culmination of a long campaign led by Ethel Gordon Fenwick to establish a register of nurses.

There was a general register for all those trained in general nursing, and supplementary registers for mental nursing, mental deficiency nursing, fever nursing, paediatric nursing, and for male nurses There was no mechanism for a nurse to transfer from one part of the register to another without re-qualifying.

Nurses were to be admitted to the Register if they had, for three years before 1 November 1919, been bona fide engaged in practice and had adequate knowledge and experience of the nursing of the sick.

See also  
Nurses Registration Act 1901 (New Zealand)
Nurses, Midwives and Health Visitors Act 1979

References

Nursing in the United Kingdom
United Kingdom Acts of Parliament 1919